Dancé is a former commune in the Orne department in north-western France. On 1 January 2016, it was merged into the new commune of Perche en Nocé.

See also
Communes of the Orne department

References

Former communes of Orne
Orne communes articles needing translation from French Wikipedia